Monsta is the debut extended play (EP) by the British band I See MONSTAS (credited as MONSTA on the release). It was released on 23 October 2012 through Owsla. The EP spawned a single, "Messiah", which entered the UK Singles Chart at number 154. "Holdin' On" climbed the UK Singles Chart to number 48, due to strong sales of the Skrillex and Nero remix. It also peaked at number ten on UK Dance Chart and number three the UK Indie Chart.

Critical response
Vibe noted that "Messiah" was "brimming [with] raw energy while a grinding bass rhythm chugs along in the background with an overlay of powerfully deep vocals". Mixmag commented that the Skrillex and Nero remix "should boost the production outfit further into the EDM stratosphere". Dancing Astronaut praised the release, commenting that "listeners can hear the power behind Skaar’s silky androgynous voice" and "adding the sounds of Skaar’s gritty soulful voice prove dubstep does not have to be the cliche “bass in your face” genre it has become".

Track listing
All songs written and produced by I See MONSTAS.

Chart performance

For "Messiah"
Chart positions listed for "Messiah".

For "Holdin' On"
Chart positions listed for "Holdin' On".

Release history

References

Owsla EPs
2012 debut EPs